The Ljubljanica, known in the Middle Ages as the Sava, is a river in the southern part of the Ljubljana Basin in Slovenia. The capital of Slovenia, Ljubljana, lies on the river. Its largest affluent is the Mali Graben Canal. The Little Ljubljanica joins the Big Ljubljanica after  and the river continues its course as the Ljubljanica.

The Ljubljanica is the continuation of several karst rivers that flow from the Prezid Karst Field to Vrhnika on the surface and underground in caves, and so the river is poetically said to have seven names (six name changes): Trbuhovica, Obrh, Stržen, Rak, Pivka, Unica, and Ljubljanica.

Archaeological significance
The Ljubljanica has become a popular site for archaeologists and treasure hunters to dive for lost relics and artifacts. Locations in the river between Ljubljana and Vrhnika have offered up pieces of history from the Stone Age to the Renaissance, belonging to a variety of groups, from local ancient cultures to more well-known groups like the Romans and the Celts. One of the more significant findings is a yew spearhead, found in 2009 in Sinja Gorica. It has been dated to about 35,000 to 45,000 before present, the Szeletian period, and supplements the scant data about the presence of Stone Age hunters in the Ljubljana Marsh area.

Exactly why the Ljubljanica became an article dumping ground is unknown, but most historians believe that it is related to how local tradition has always held the river as a sacred place. These treasures may have been offered "to the river during rites of passage, in mourning, or as thanksgiving for battles won."

The Ljubljanica has become a popular attraction in Europe for treasure hunters. This has created an ethical debate between local historians and international treasure seekers. It is believed that the river has offered up between 10,000 and 13,000 objects, of which many have been lost to the public. Many pieces have been sold into private collections, or are hidden away by the original treasure hunters. In 2003, to help curb this trend, Slovenia's national parliament declared the river a site of cultural importance and banned diving in it without a permit.

Gallery

See also
 Ljubljanica Sluice Gate

References

External links

 Condition of Ljubljanica - graphs, in the following order, of water level, flow and temperature data for the past 30 days (taken in Moste by ARSO)
 https://web.archive.org/web/20070311005227/http://expo98.literal.si/eng/zakladi/vode-slovenije/ljubljanica.html
 https://web.archive.org/web/20081011222409/http://www7.nationalgeographic.com/ngm/0701/feature6/index.html

 
Rivers of Inner Carniola
 
Rivers of Ljubljana
Transport in Ljubljana
Stone Age sites in Slovenia
Bronze Age sites in Slovenia
Iron Age sites in Slovenia
Roman sites in Slovenia
Archaeology of Slovenia
Underwater archaeological sites
Protected areas in Ljubljana
Articles containing video clips
Ljubljana Marshes